This is a list of Estonian football transfers in the summer transfer window 2015 by club. Only transfers in Meistriliiga are included.

Meistriliiga

Levadia Tallinn

In: 

Out:

Sillamäe Kalev

In: 

Out:

Flora Tallinn

In: 

Out:

Nõmme Kalju

In: 

Out:

Infonet Tallinn

In: 

Out:

Paide Linnameeskond

In: 

Out:

Tammeka Tartu

In: 

Out:

Narva Trans

In: 

Out:

Pärnu Linnameeskond

In: 

Out:

Tulevik Viljandi

In: 

Out:

See also
 2015 Meistriliiga
 2014–15 Estonian Cup
 2015–16 Estonian Cup

References

External links
 Official site of the Estonian Football Association
 Official site of the Meistriliiga

Estonian
transfers
2015